Richard Lynch is a Welsh television and film actor best known for playing the character of Garry Monk
in S4C's long-running Welsh-language soap Pobol y Cwm.

Early life
Lynch is an alumnus of Ysgol Gyfun Rhydfelen, a Welsh Medium comprehensive school near Pontypridd. He graduated with in Drama from Aberystwyth University in 1987.

Career
Lynch first came to prominence in the 1986 Karl Francis' film Milwr Bychan playing young soldier Will Thomas. Further film appearances include Branwen (1994), Darklands (1996), The Proposition (1997), and Y Mabinogi (2003). Lynch starred in numerous television productions and series, including The Christmas Stallion (1992), The Lifeboat (1994), Tales from Pleasure Beach (2001) and Hinterland/Y Gwyll.

In 2013 Lynch was awarded a Fellowship of Aberystwyth University.

Partial filmography
Milwr Bychan (1986)
The District Nurse (TV series 1987)
 Babylon Bypassed (1988)
Eight Men Out (1988)
Spirit (1989)
Screen One (TV series 1989)
The Christmas Stallion (TV movie 1992)
Thicker Than Water (TV movie 1994)
The Healer (TV movie 1994)
The Lifeboat (TV series 1994)
Branwen (1995)
Darklands (1996)
The Proposition (1997)
Dangerfield (TV series 1999)
Score (TV movie 2001)
Tales from Pleasure Beach (TV mini-series 2001)
A Mind to Kill (TV series 1997–2002)
Y Mabinogi (English title: Otherworld) (2003)
Secret History of Religion: Knights Templar (TV movie 2006)
''Hinterland/Y Gwyll (Bilingual TV series 2016)

References

External links
 
 BBC Pobol Y Cwm
 Yr actor – gwaith a hamdden

Living people
Welsh male television actors
Welsh male film actors
Welsh-speaking actors
People educated at Ysgol Gyfun Garth Olwg
Year of birth missing (living people)